The 2010 Danish Figure Skating Championships was held at the Rødovre Skøjtearena in Rødovre from 3 to 6 December 2009. Skaters competed in the disciplines of men's singles, ladies' singles, and ice dancing on the levels of senior, junior, novice, and the pre-novice levels of debs, springs, cubs, and chicks. The results were used to choose the teams to the 2010 World Championships, the 2010 European Championships, the 2010 Nordic Championships, and the 2010 World Junior Championships.

Seniorl results

Men

Ladies

Ice dancing

Junior results

Men

Ladies

Novice results

Girls

Ice dancing

Pre-novice results

Debs girls

Springs boys

Springs girls

Cubs boys

Cubs girls

Chicks girls

External links
 DM 2010
 Dansk Skøjte Union

Danish Figure Skating Championships
2009 in figure skating
Danish Figure Skating Championships, 2010
Figure Skating Championships